The 2020 NCAA National Collegiate Women's Ice Hockey Tournament was a planned single-elimination tournament by eight schools to determine the national champion of women's NCAA Division I college ice hockey. The quarterfinals were scheduled to be played at the campuses of the seeded teams on March 14, 2020, with the Frozen Four to be played on March 20 and 22, 2020 at Agganis Arena in Boston, Massachusetts. Boston University was scheduled to host the tournament, the second time that it would have hosted the Frozen Four. On March 12, the NCAA announced that the tournament was cancelled due to the COVID-19 pandemic.

Qualifying teams 
In the sixth year under this qualification format, the winners of all four Division I conference tournaments received automatic berths to the NCAA tournament. The other four teams were selected at-large. The top four teams were then seeded and received home ice for the quarterfinals.

Bracket 

Note: * denotes overtime period(s)

Results

National Quarterfinals

(1) Cornell vs. Mercyhurst

(2) Wisconsin vs. Clarkson

(3) Northeastern vs. Princeton

(4) Minnesota vs. Ohio State

References 

NCAA Women's Ice Hockey Tournament
1
NCAA National Collegiate Women's Ice Hockey Tournament